Marauna is a genus of beetles in the family Cerambycidae, containing the following species:

 Marauna abati Galileo & Martins, 2007
 Marauna bucki Galileo & Martins, 2007
 Marauna punctatissima Martins & Galileo, 2006

References

Callidiopini